Antonio's Breakfast is a 2006 Brixton set drama short film written and directed by Daniel Mulloy. It premiered in Sundance Film Festival and went on to win the BAFTA Award for Best Short Film.

Premise
Antonio, a young black teenager, is woken by his father's (George Irving) rasping breaths.  It soon becomes clear that the young Antonio is his paralyzed father's primary care giver. As Antonio's friends arrive Antonio is forced to choose between a life lived for his father or one in which he makes his own way. His ultimate decision is one laced with uncertainty and guilt.

Production
Mulloy held castings around the Brixton and Peckham areas of London. He spent a year work-shopping with the chosen young cast members, several of whom would appear in his later films. The story of Antonio's Breakfast is built around Mulloy's childhood experiences of growing up in Brixton.

"When writing, I have a strong sense of what needs to be communicated. I then work with the artists in rehearsals until they have made the performances their own. In Antonio’s Breakfast this meant that the young guys spent time working out what they thought would feel natural for them to say and I trusted them implicitly and went with it." Daniel Mulloy from Get Your Short Film Funded, Made and Seen by Tricia Tuttle

Reception
Antonio's Breakfast premiered at the 2006 Sundance Film Festival to international critical acclaim and in the UK it went on to win the 2006 British Academy Award.

Accolades
 premiered Sundance Film Festival 2006
 Winner 59th British Academy Film Awards Best Short Film 2006
 Winner Grand Jury Prize Aspen Shortsfest
 Winner Indianapolis
 Winner FilmFest Kansas City
 Winner Melbourne
 Winner Indianapolis
 Special Mention Jury Award Clermont-Ferrand International Short Film Festival

References

External links

Further reading 
 Making Short Films : The Complete Guide from Script to Screen - Clifford Thurlow
 Get Your Short made, Funded and Filmed: The Shooting People Shorts Directory – Tricia Tuttle

2006 films
British drama short films
BAFTA winners (films)
2006 drama films
2000s English-language films
2000s British films